News Express is a Hindi-language 24/7 News television channel, owned by News Express natwork Faizabad. The channel is a free-to-air and launched on 19 May 2007. The channel is available across all major cable and DTH platforms as well as online.

References

Hindi-language television channels in India
Television channels and stations established in 2007
Hindi-language television stations
Television stations in Faizabad